Thom Collegiate is a public high school located in the Coronation Park area of north Regina, SK. A part of Regina Public Schools, it is named after Douglas J. Thom - a lawyer, author, and member of the Regina Collegiate Board.

The school offers a dual-track French immersion program. It also provides various Advanced Placement courses.

Thom's feeder schools include Coronation Park Community School, Dr. L.M. Hanna School, École Centennial Community School, École Elsie Mironuck Community School, Gladys McDonald School, Imperial Community School, M.J. Coldwell School, McDermid Community School, and Ruth Pawson School.

Athletics
Sports offered at Thom include:
Cheerleading
Badminton
Basketball
Cross Country
Curling
Hockey
Rugby
Soccer
Track and Field
Volleyball
Wrestling

Notable alumni
Drew Callander, Former NHL player
Jock Callander, Former NHL player
Brad Elberg, Former CFL player
Stu Foord, Former CFL player
Neal Hughes, Former CFL player
Nick Hutchins, Former CFL player
Kennedy Nkeyasen, CFL player
Barry Pittendrigh, Molecular biologist
Kevin Tkachuk, Rugby player
Dan Clark (Canadian football), CFL player

Affiliated communities
Argyle Park-Englewood (pop. 3990)
Coronation Park (pop. 6555)
Dieppe (pop. 1815)
Normanview (pop. 4280)
Normanview West (pop. 3240)
North Central (pop. 10,350)
Northeast (pop. 7090)
Prairie View (pop. 6325)
Regent Park (pop. 2755)
Rosemont/Mount Royal (pop. 8485)
Sherwood/McCarthy (pop. 6695)
Twin Lakes (pop. 5510)
Uplands (pop. 5610)
Walsh Acres/Lakeridge (pop. 7100)

References

High schools in Regina, Saskatchewan
Educational institutions established in 1963
International Baccalaureate schools in Saskatchewan
1963 establishments in Saskatchewan